The 1965 Monaco Grand Prix was a Formula One motor race held at Monaco on 30 May 1965. It was race 2 of 10 in both the 1965 World Championship of Drivers and the 1965 International Cup for Formula One Manufacturers. The 100-lap race was won by BRM driver Graham Hill from pole position. Lorenzo Bandini finished second for the Ferrari team and Hill's teammate Jackie Stewart came in third.

Jim Clark, Dan Gurney and Mike Spence did not participate in this race, since Team Lotus raced in the 1965 Indy 500, won by Clark. As of 2022, this is the second and last time a driver has crashed into the harbour, with Paul Hawkins falling in on lap 79, after the 1955 Monaco Grand Prix accident of Alberto Ascari.

Classification

Qualifying

Race

Championship standings after the race

Drivers' Championship standings

Constructors' Championship standings

 Notes: Only the top five positions are included for both sets of standings.

References

Monaco Grand Prix
Monaco Grand Prix
Grand Prix